Ian Rush is a Welsh former professional footballer who represented the Wales national football team from 1980 to 1996, scoring 28 international goals in 73 appearances. He made his debut on 21 May 1980, in a 1–0 defeat against Scotland in the British Home Championship. Rush scored his first international goal two years later in a 3–0 home game victory against Northern Ireland.

In his 55th match, a 6–0 win over the Faroe Islands on 9 September 1992, Rush scored his 23rd international goal and the only hat-trick of his career. This drew him level with the top scorers of Wales: Trevor Ford and Ivor Allchurch. Ford had scored 23 goals in 38 matches between 1947 and 1957, and Allchurch had scored the same number in 68 matches between 1951 and 1966. Rush became the Wales national team's all-time top goalscorer on 31 March 1993, when he broke the record with a goal against Belgium.

Rush scored four more goals in his Wales career to extend the record to 28 goals. He held it until 2018, when Gareth Bale scored his 29th international goal against China. Rush's tally included a goal that saw Wales beat then-world champions Germany in 1991 by a score of 1–0. He retired from international football in 1996, making his final appearance for Wales in a 3–0 defeat to Italy on 24 January. During his international career, Wales failed to progress further than the qualifying stage of any major tournament.

Goals 
Scores and results list Wales' goal tally first.

Statistics

See also 
 List of international goals scored by Gareth Bale
 Wales national football team records and statistics

References

Work cited 
 

Rush, Ian
Rush, Ian